{{DISPLAYTITLE:C21H24O2}}
The molecular formula C21H24O2 (molar mass: 308.414 g/mol) may refer to:

 Gestrinone
 Tosagestin, or 11-methylene-δ15-norethisterone

Molecular formulas